Marina Budhos is an American writer.

Biography
Marina Budhos was born in Queens, New York to an Indo-Guyanese father and a Jewish American mother. Both her parents were teachers. They met when her father was working in the Indian Consulate in New York in the 1950s. Budhos attended Cornell University where she graduated magna cum laude in English. She then completed her master's degree at Brown University. Budhos married Marc Aronson on September 14, 1997.

Budhos has been published in numerous publications, including The Nation, Ms. Magazine, LitHub, Ploughshares, The Kenyon Review and Asian Pacific American Journal. Budhos has won several awards for her writing. She received an NEA in Literature, an EMMA (Exceptional Merit Media Award), and a Rona Jaffe Award for Women Writers. She has also been honored with an Asian/Pacific American Award for Literature and a Walter Award. Budhos won three Fellowships from New Jersey's Council on the Arts. Budhos went to India as a Fulbright Scholar and is currently a professor emerita at William Paterson University.  She has taught at Vassar College, Eugene College, the New School, and the City College of New York.

Bibliography
House of Waiting, Global City Press (New York, NY), 1995.
The Professor of Light, Putnam (New York, NY), 1999.
Remix: Conversations with Immigrant Teenagers, Holt (New York, NY), 1999.
Ask Me No Questions, Atheneum (New York, NY), 2006.
Tell Us We're Home, Atheneum (New York, NY), 2010.
Sugar Changed the World: A Story of Magic, Spice, Slavery, Freedom & Science, (co-author, Marc Aronson) Houghton Mifflin (New York, NY), 2010.
Watched, Wendy Lamb Books/Random House (New York, NY), 2016.
Eyes of the World: Robert Capa, Gerda Taro & The Invention of Modern Photojournalism, (co-author, Marc Aronson), Henry Holt (New York, NY), 2017.
The Long Ride, Wendy Lamb Books/Random House (New York, NY), 2019.
We Are All We Have, Wendy Lamb Books/Random House (New York, NY), 2022

Sources

Living people
American women writers
Cornell University alumni
Brown University alumni
Writers from Queens, New York
American people of Indo-Guyanese descent
Year of birth missing (living people)
21st-century American women